North Lawndale Community News is a weekly community newspaper based in Chicago's North Lawndale neighborhood. It is published  by Strategic Human Services, a local non-profit agency. The paper is financed through grants, as well as subscriptions and advertising revenue.

History 

North Lawndale Community News was started in 1999 by a group of North Lawndale residents to communicate important information throughout their community. It began as a monthly newspaper, but it was eventually able to achieve weekly circulation.

During the Douglas branch reconstruction project, North Lawndale Community News raised concerns that CTA did not hire any neighborhood residents for the project. The resulting controversy ultimately prompted CTA to change its policy.

Regular features 

The North Lawndale Community News publishes a mix of community news articles and articles that advice residents of services and opportunities in the area. Unusual for community newspapers, it features a regular film review column (At the Flicks, written by David Schulz.

NLCN draws extensively on talent from the North Lawndale community. Editors, writers and photographers are recruited from the neighborhood population, and local teenagers distribute the papers to subscribers.

Sources

External links 

Newspapers published in Chicago
Free newspapers